Mount Auburn Township is one of seventeen townships in Christian County, Illinois, USA.  As of the 2020 census, its population was 912 and it contained 435 housing units.

Geography

Cities, towns, villages
 Mount Auburn

Unincorporated towns
 Bolivia at 
 Grove City at 
 Roby at

Cemeteries
The township contains these five cemeteries: Furrow, Grove City Methodist, Hinckle, Milligan and Mount Auburn.

Airports and landing strips
 Hardy Airport

Demographics
As of the 2020 census there were 912 people, 427 households, and 277 families residing in the township. The racial makeup of the township was 94.41% White, 0.22% African American, 0.22% Native American, 0.33% Asian, 0.00% Pacific Islander, 0.77% from other races, and 4.06% from two or more races. Hispanic or Latino of any race were 0.77% of the population.

There were 427 households, out of which 34.40% had children under the age of 18 living with them, 62.06% were married couples living together, 1.17% had a female householder with no spouse present, and 35.13% were non-families. 26.70% of all households were made up of individuals, and 15.50% had someone living alone who was 65 years of age or older. The average household size was 2.29 and the average family size was 2.80.

The township's age distribution consisted of 21.6% under the age of 18, 6.6% from 18 to 24, 28% from 25 to 44, 27.3% from 45 to 64, and 16.5% who were 65 years of age or older. The median age was 40.9 years. For every 100 females, there were 115.5 males. For every 100 females age 18 and over, there were 98.2 males.

The median income for a household in the township was $56,797, and the median income for a family was $68,098. Males had a median income of $36,086 versus $30,645 for females. The per capita income for the township was $27,498. About 2.5% of families and 5.9% of the population were below the poverty line, including none of those under age 18 and 2.5% of those age 65 or over.

School districts
 Edinburg Community Unit School District 4
 Rochester Community Unit School District 3a
 Taylorville Community Unit School District 3

Political districts
 State House District 87
 State Senate District 44

References
 
 United States Census Bureau 2009 TIGER/Line Shapefiles
 United States National Atlas

External links
 City-Data.com
 Illinois State Archives
 Township Officials of Illinois

Townships in Christian County, Illinois
Townships in Illinois